Negroes with Guns is a 1962 book by civil rights activist Robert F. Williams. Timothy B. Tyson said, Negroes with Guns was "The single most important intellectual influence on Huey P. Newton, the founder of the Black Panther Party". The book is used in college courses and is discussed in current debates.

Negroes with Guns was Williams' experience throughout The Civil Rights Movement of Monroe, North Carolina. Because black human rights were constantly violated, the self-defense policy was born, with Williams saying there was a need to "meet violence with violence." However, Williams claimed that black militants were not promoting violence, but were combating it, believing in self-defense and not aggression.

In film 
The subject matter of the book was made into the documentary film Negroes with Guns: Rob Williams and Black Power, directed by Sandra Dickson and Churchill Roberts, released in 2004. The film provides witness testimonies of many of the events described in the book.

A documentary by Sandra Dickson and Churchill Roberts, Rob Williams and Black Power, attempts to gather Williams from margins of movement scholarship.

References

External links
  Google Books page

1962 non-fiction books
American non-fiction books
American political books
Anti-racism in the United States
Non-fiction books adapted into films